Greece competed at the 2015 European Games, in Baku, Azerbaijan from 12 to 28 June 2015.

Medalists

Archery

Men

Women

Mixed

Badminton

Singles

Doubles

Basketball 3X3

Men

Women

Boxing

Men

Canoe Sprint

Men

Women

Cycling

BMX

Mountain Bike

Road
Men

Women

Diving

Men

Fencing

Men

Women

Gymnastics

Artistic
Men
Individual

Team

Women 
Individual

Team

Rhythmic
Greece has qualified one athlete after the performance at the 2013 Rhythmic Gymnastics European Championships.

Trampoline
Greece has qualified two athletes based on the results at the 2014 European Trampoline Championships. The gymnasts will compete in both the individual and the synchronized event.

Women

Judo

Men

Karate

Men

Women

Sambo

Men

Shooting

Men

Women

Mixed

Swimming

Men

Women

Synchronized Swimming

Table Tennis

Singles

Team

Taekwondo

Men

Women

Triathlon

Volleyball

Beach

Water polo

Men's tournament

Women's tournament

Wrestling

Men's Greco-Roman

Men's Freestyle

Women's Freestyle

References

Nations at the 2015 European Games
European Games
2015